Richard Temple-Nugent-Brydges-Chandos-Grenville, 1st Duke of Buckingham and Chandos  (20 March 1776 – 17 January 1839), styled Earl Temple from 1784 to 1813 and known as the Marquess of Buckingham from 1813 to 1822, was a British landowner and politician.

Background
Born Richard Temple-Nugent-Grenville, he was the eldest son of George Nugent-Temple-Grenville, 1st Marquess of Buckingham, son of George Grenville, Prime Minister of Great Britain. His mother was Lady Mary Nugent, daughter of Robert Nugent, 1st Earl Nugent. Thomas Grenville and Lord Grenville were his uncles.

He was educated at Brasenose College, Oxford, where he matriculated in 1791.

Political career
Earl Temple, as he was known in his father's lifetime, was elected Member of Parliament for Buckinghamshire in 1797. In 1806 he was made a Privy Counsellor and appointed Vice-President of the Board of Trade and Joint Paymaster of the Forces in the Ministry of All the Talents headed by his uncle, Lord Grenville. He retained these posts until the fall of the Grenville administration in 1807. He left the House of Commons in 1813 when he succeeded his father in the marquessate. In 1820 he was appointed a Knight of the Garter. In 1822 he was further honoured when he was made Earl Temple of Stowe, with remainder to his granddaughter Anne Eliza Mary, and Marquess of Chandos and Duke of Buckingham and Chandos, with normal remainder to heirs male. He returned to ministerial office in July 1830 when he was made Lord Steward of the Household, but only held the post for a short while. Apart from his political career he was also Lord-Lieutenant of Buckinghamshire from 1813 to 1839.

Nicknames such as "Lord Grenville's fat nephew", Ph D (Phat Duke), and the "gros Marquis", attested to his size and unpopularity.

Family
In April 1796, aged 20, the then Earl Temple married the Lady Anne Brydges, daughter and sole heir of the late James Brydges, 3rd Duke of Chandos. Accordingly, Nugent-Temple-Grenville added Brydges and Chandos to their family names (and those of their children) by Royal licence of 15 November 1799; and their full family name became the remarkable quintuple-barreled Temple-Nugent-Brydges-Chandos-Grenville. His wife died in 1836 and he died in January 1839, aged 62, and he was succeeded by his son, Richard.

References

External links 
 

1776 births
1839 deaths
1
Knights of the Garter
Temple, Richard Temple-Nugent-Brydges-Chandos-Grenville, Earl
Temple, Richard Temple-Nugent-Brydges-Chandos-Grenville, Earl
People from Buckinghamshire
Lord-Lieutenants of Buckinghamshire
Members of the Privy Council of the United Kingdom
Paymasters of the Forces
Temple, Richard Temple-Nugent-Brydges-Chandos-Grenville, Earl
Temple, Richard Temple-Nugent-Brydges-Chandos-Grenville, Earl
Temple, Richard Temple-Nugent-Brydges-Chandos-Grenville, Earl
Temple, Richard Temple-Nugent-Brydges-Chandos-Grenville, Earl
Temple, Richard Temple-Nugent-Brydges-Chandos-Grenville, Earl
Temple, Richard Temple-Nugent-Brydges-Chandos-Grenville, Earl
Buckingham and Chandos, D1
UK MPs who were granted peerages
British slave owners
Richard
Earls Nugent
Peers of the United Kingdom created by George IV